QuiBids.com is an American online retailer headquartered in Oklahoma City, Oklahoma, United States. It is a retail website that operates as a bidding fee auction, also known as a penny auction. The company has been sued under allegations that it is a form of illegal gambling and that its advertising is misleading. It advertises the price products are auctioned at in QuiBids cash and compares them to US dollars without disclosing the different currencies being used.

History
Matt Beckham and Shaun Tilford (now QuiBids’s chief executive officer and former chief technology officer, respectively) founded the company in 2009 and launched the site from Beckham’s Oklahoma City apartment in the fall of that year. The company name is a portmanteau of the words "quick" and "bids", and is pronounced the way both words sound.

In November 2013, QuiBids officially re-branded itself as an entertainment retail auction site, selling products such as consumer electronics, home and garden products, apparel and jewelry. The okcBIZ website named QuiBids the third best small company to work for in Oklahoma in June 2012.

Lawsuits
In 2010 Lawrence Locke filed a class action lawsuit against QuiBids claiming it violated the Oklahoma Consumer Protection Act and common law fraud, alleging that it does not disclose that the majority of customers lose money on the site by bidding on items they did not win. Jeff Geurts, chief financial officer of QuiBids, said the suit has no merit, since QuiBids allows customers who lost an auction to buy the item at the retail price, minus the amount of money spent on bidding.

Other federal lawsuits have also been filed claiming illegal gambling and false advertising by, among other things, misappropriating images from news websites and fabricating customer testimonials. The Washington state attorney general's office studied the bidding-fee scheme and concluded that it does not constitute gambling under its state laws. It is now studying whether or not such "penny auctions" constitute a lottery.

References

Further reading
 [https://books.google.com/books?id=cH1qBQAAQBAJ&dq=%22QuiBids%22&pg=PA56 "An Empirical Analysis of Quibids' Penny Auctions]. Agent-Mediated Electronic Commerce. Designing Trading Strategies and Mechanisms for Electronic Markets. Springer. pp. 56–69. 
 "Quibids: Can you buy electronics for a penny? (No.)". The Christian Science Monitor.
 "How To Win at QuiBids Auctions—Which Might Just Mean Stay Away". Business Insider.
 Freeland, Bridget (2 December 2010). "QuiBids Online Auction Faces Class Action". Courthouse News Service.
 "Dissatisfied customer sues Oklahoma City-based penny auction website". The Oklahoman.
 "Auction site faces class suit". The Chronicle Herald''.

External links

American companies established in 2009
Retail companies established in 2009
Internet properties established in 2009
Online auction websites of the United States
2009 establishments in Oklahoma